Lum no Love Song (ラムのラブソング / Love Song of Lum) is the debut single of Japanese pop singer Yuko Matsutani. The single was released on October 21, 1981 and was created as the theme song for the anime series Urusei Yatsura. The song was used as the theme song from its debut on October 14, 1981 until the 77th episode released on July 20, 1983.

The song is also credited as "Urusei Yatsura no Theme" (うる星やつらのテーマ / Theme of Urusei Yatsura), as it is registered by JASRAC. It has become an iconic anime theme and has been covered by various artists throughout both Japan and South Korea.

Information
Lum no Love Song is the debut single by Japanese artist Yuko Matsutani. The single debuted as the theme song for the anime series Urusei Yatsura on October 14, 1981, and was released physically on record on October 21, 1989. The song was used for the anime until the 77th episode, released on July 20, 1983.

Both "Lum no Love Song" and the b-side, "Uchuu wa Taihen da!" (宇宙は大ヘンだ！ / Space is Trouble!), were written by musical composer Izumi Kobayashi. The lyrical portions of both tracks were written by Akira Itou.

"Lum no Love Song" is also credited as "Urusei Yatsura no Theme ~Lum no Love Song~" by JASRAC.

Various artists have covered the title track, including Tomoya Nagase, Koda Misono, Nana Kitade and South Korean girl group Orange Caramel. Koda Misono's cover version peaked at #10 on the Oricon Singles Chart.

Track listing

References

External links
http://www.avexnet.or.jp/misono/discography/ Misono's Official Web site

1981 singles
Anime songs
Misono songs
1981 songs
Songs written by Misono
Avex Trax singles
Urusei Yatsura